Florencia is a district of the San Carlos canton, in the Alajuela province of Costa Rica.

Location 

It is located in the northern region of the country and borders with 3 districts; Cutris to the north, La Tigra to the west (also with the canton of San Ramón), Quesada and La Palmera to the east. While to the south it borders with the canton of Zarcero.

Its head, the city of Florencia, is located 9.7 km (22 minutes) to the NW of Ciudad Quesada and 116 km (2 hours 32 minutes) to the NW of San José the capital of the nation.

Geography 
Florencia has an area of  km² and an mean elevation of  metres. with a range between 100 and 600 meters above sea level.

This variation of altitude is due to the fact that the southern part of the district is formed by the mountain foothills of the Central Mountain Range, while to the north, the territory follows a clear descent towards the plains of San Carlos.

Demographics 

For the 2011 census, Florencia had a population of  inhabitants. It is the sixth most populated of the canton, behind of Quesada, Aguas Zarcas, Pocosol and La Fortuna.

Transportation

Road transportation 
The district is covered by the following road routes:
 National Route 4
 National Route 35
 National Route 141
 National Route 739
 National Route 748

Economy 

Florence, the head, has health services, educational, financial, legal, lodging, post office, car repair, construction.

Entertainment services are also offered in nightly venues.

In terms of trade, the sale of fast foods, groceries, shoes, clothes, appliances and various accessories stands out.

See also 
 Canton of San Carlos
 District of Quesada
 District of Buenavista
 District of Aguas Zarcas
 District of Venecia
 District of Pital
 District of La Fortuna
 District of La Tigra
 District of La Palmera
 District of Venado
 District of Cutris
 District of Monterrey
 District of Pocosol
 List of districts of Costa Rica

References 

Districts of Alajuela Province
Populated places in Alajuela Province